Moufak Awad (born 11 May 1997), is a Qatari professional footballer who plays as a right back for Qatar Stars League side Al-Rayyan and previously Qatar National U23 team. Moufak represented Qatar in the 2016 AFC U-19 Championship.

Career statistics

Club

Notes

References

External links
 
 Mouafak Awad at Google 
 
 
 
 Mouafak Awad at FootballNation.eu

1997 births
Living people
Qatari footballers
Qatari expatriate footballers
Expatriate footballers in Austria
Expatriate footballers in Spain
Association football defenders
Al-Sailiya SC players
Cultural Leonesa footballers
LASK players
Al-Khor SC players
Al-Rayyan SC players
Qatar Stars League players
Qatari expatriate sportspeople in Spain
Qatari expatriate sportspeople in Austria